Dichelopa tarsodes is a species of moth of the family Tortricidae. It is found in Australia, where it has been recorded from New South Wales.

The wingspan is about 12 mm.

References

Moths described in 1910
Dichelopa